Nanocem is a consortium of academic and private industry groups that researches the properties of cement and concrete on the nano- and micro-scales, with a particular focus on reducing carbon dioxide emissions at all stages of production. Nanocem was founded as an independent consortium in 2004 after a rejection of a 2002 bid to the Network of Excellence (European Framework Programme). The research is conducted at a fundamental level. Yet high levels of industry involvement allow to focus on solutions that can work in practice and not just in theory.

This unique model of cooperation between industry and the academic community has led to the identification of common issues, shared knowledge and clear benefits for all those involved. For instance Nanocem has been able to help map the research needs for lower carbon concrete. This guidance helped focus research by companies and third parties.

The consortium is headquartered in Lausanne, Switzerland. As of 2018, it includes 34 organizations and supports more than 120 researchers. There are some 60 PhD and PostDoctoral research projects in the area of fundamental research that have been supported by Nanocem.

Nanocem's eleven completed core projects have included studies of interactions between admixtures and cement, concrete durability, the kinetics of cement hydration, and the use of magnetic resonance imaging techniques in concrete analysis. Recent Nanocem-sponsored projects have included the use of nanotechnology in cementitious materials, the effects of sulfate on concrete, the development of a bipolar mineral organic composite that can bond with Portland cement on one pole and polymerize with the other, and studies of cement hydration at the molecular level. Its research has led to more than one hundred published papers and conference papers. There are some 120 academic researchers in the team who between them are in the process of managing some 60 PhD and PostDoctoral research projects in the area of fundamental research.

Participating organizations 
Nanocem consists of 34 academic and private industry partners. The members of Nanocem collectively have access to a large range of state of the art equipment for the study of cementitious materials.

Academic 
 Aarhus University
 Bauhaus-Universität Weimar
 Czech Technical University in Prague
 Danish Technological Institute
 École polytechnique fédérale de Lausanne
 ETH Zurich
 Eduardo Torroja Institute for Construction Science
 French Alternative Energies and Atomic Energy Commission
 French institute of science and technology for transport, spatial planning, development and networks
 Imperial College London
 Lund University
 Norwegian University of Science and Technology
 Polytechnic University of Catalonia
 Slovenian National Building and Civil Engineering Institute
 Swiss Federal Laboratories for Materials Science and Technology
 Technical University of Denmark
 Technical University of Munich
 University of Aberdeen
 University of Burgundy
 University of Leeds
 University of Sheffield
 University of Surrey
 vdz gGmbH
 Vienna University of Technology

Industrial 
 Aalborg Portland
 BASF
 CHRYSO
 CRH
 HeidelbergCement
 GCP Applied Technologies
 LafargeHolcim
 Siam Cement
 Sika AG
 Titan Cement

References

External links 
 
 List of Nanocem publications and conference papers

2004 establishments in Switzerland
Concrete